The 2018 FC Kairat season is the 8th successive season that the club playing in the Kazakhstan Premier League, the highest tier of association football in Kazakhstan, since their promotion back to the top flight in 2009. Kairat will participate in the Kazakhstan Super Cup and the Europa League as well as the Kazakhstan Cup and Premier League.

Season events
On 15 October 2018, Carlos Alós left Kairat by mutual consent, with Andrei Karpovich being appointed as Caretaker manager.

Squad

Out on loan

Transfers

In

Out

Loans in

Loans out

Released

Trial

Friendlies

Competitions

Super Cup

Premier League

Results summary

Results by round

Results

League table

Kazakhstan Cup

Final

UEFA Europa League

Qualifying rounds

Squad statistics

Appearances and goals

|-
|colspan="14"|Players away from Kairat on loan:
|-
|colspan="14"|Players who left Kairat during the season:

|}

Goal scorers

Disciplinary record

Notes

References

External links
Official Website

FC Kairat seasons
Kairat